Boycho Branzov (28 May 1946 – 2 June 2003) was a Bulgarian basketball player. He competed in the men's tournament at the 1968 Summer Olympics.

References

1946 births
2003 deaths
Bulgarian men's basketball players
Olympic basketball players of Bulgaria
Basketball players at the 1968 Summer Olympics
Sportspeople from Burgas